The Indonesian island of Java is almost entirely of volcanic origin, and contains numerous volcanoes, 45 of which are considered active volcanoes.  As is the case for many other Indonesian islands, volcanoes have played a vital role in the geological and human history of Java. Indeed, land is created on Java as a result of lava flows, ash deposits, and mud flows (lahars).  Volcanoes are a major contributor to the immense fertility of Java, as natural erosion transports volcanic material as alluvium to the island's plains, forming thick layers of fertile sediment. The benefit is not just in the immediate vicinity of the volcano, with fine ash emitted from eruptions being dispersed over wide areas.

Climbing volcanoes (and other mountains) is increasingly popular.

List of volcanoes 

This list is of volcanoes from the west of Java to the east.  Local terminology and usage has the word Gunung (mount or mountain) precede the names.

West Java 
 Pulosari  Stratovolcano   
 Gunung Karang Stratovolcano   
 Kiaraberes-Gagak Stratovolcano  
 Perbakti Stratovolcano  
 Mount Salak    Stratovolcano  
 Mount Gede     Stratovolcano  
 Mount Pangrango Stratovolcano
 Mount Patuha Stratovolcano  
 Wayang-Windu Lava dome  
 Mount Malabar Stratovolcano  
 Tangkuban Parahu Stratovolcano  
 Mount Papandayan Stratovolcanoes  
 Mount Kendang Stratovolcano  
 Kamojang Stratovolcanoes  
 Mount Guntur Complex volcano  
 Mount Tampomas Stratovolcano  
 Galunggung Stratovolcano  
 Talagabodas Stratovolcano  
 Karaha Crater Fumarole field  
 Mount Cereme Stratovolcano

Central Java 
 Mount Slamet Stratovolcano  
 Dieng Volcanic Complex Complex volcano  
 Mount Sundoro Stratovolcano  
 Mount Sumbing Stratovolcano  
 Mount Ungaran Stratovolcano  
 Mount Telomoyo Stratovolcano  
 Mount Merbabu Stratovolcano 
 Mount Merapi Stratovolcano 
 Mount Muria Stratovolcano 
 Mount Lawu Stratovolcano (bordering with East Java)

East Java 
Mount Lawu Stratovolcano (bordering with Central Java)
Mount Wilis Stratovolcano
Kelut Stratovolcano
Kawi-Butak Stratovolcanoes
Arjuno-Welirang Stratovolcano
Penanggungan Stratovolcano
 Malang Plain Maars
 Semeru Stratovolcano
 Mount Bromo
Lamongan Stratovolcano
 Mount Lurus
Iyang-Argapura Complex volcano
 Raung Stratovolcano
 Ijen Stratovolcanoes
 Baluran Stratovolcano

List of active volcanoes

See also 

 Reinout Willem van Bemmelen
 List of volcanoes in Indonesia

References 

 Whitten, T, Soaeriaatmadja, R. E., Afiff, S. A., (editors), The Ecology of Java and Bali, Periplus Editions (HK) Ltd. 1996, Hardcover, 969 pages,